María Rosa García García (born 15 January 1978 in San Fernando, Cádiz), better known as Niña Pastori, is a Spanish flamenco singer (cantaora).

Biography
María Rosa García was born in 1978 in the town of San Fernando in Cadiz. The youngest of five siblings and only daughter of a military man (José García) and flamenco singer "La Pastori" García.

Her stage name is "Niña Pastori" because among her siblings of four older brothers, she was the only woman and she was referred to as "la niña", she was also "la única hija de la Pastori" (the only daughter of la Pastori) and when she went on stage people remarked “va a cantar la niña de la Pastori” (la Pastori's girl is going to sing). Her initial name was "La niña de la Pastori", but she later changed it to "Niña Pastori".

She went to junior school at the Vicente Tofiño school in San Fernando (Cádiz).

She started her artistic career at a young age singing in Andalusia. At the age of six she accompanied her mother in the flamenco tablaos of "Barrio de la Pastora", and a year later won a singing contest at the "El Chato" club in San Fernando, where she sang bulerías (a flamenco style) and won first prize. In doing so, she showed that she had skills despite her early age.

Among her first mentors was Camarón de la Isla, also from San Fernando (Cádiz), whose purist flamenco style she followed in her early years. Later she added a more commercial, pop tone to her image and style without losing her flamenco roots. Artists Paco Ortega and Alejandro Sanz helped her produce her first album, Entre dos puertos, when she was seventeen and with whom sold more than 150,000 units, achieving commercial popularity. Part of this was due to the single Tú me camelas, which was a hit in Spain in summer 1996. Since then, she has recorded ten albums and has sold two million records.

Her second album, Eres luz (1998) confirmed her success, with songs again by Paco Ortega and Alejandro Sanz, Parrita, Manuel Malou and her brother Paco. In 2000, she published her third album, Cañaílla, produced by Alejandro Sanz and Josemi Carmona of the flamenco group Ketama; it is dedicated to her home town and more flamenco than the previous works. Her album María (2002) evolved to a more personal style, taking part in the lyrics and composition of some of her songs, a trend that she continued in No hay quinto malo, her fifth album (2004).

In Joyas prestadas (2006), where Niña Pastori makes personal versions of songs originally by artists from very different styles and genres, such as boleros, ballads, coplas and classics from Spain and Latin America. The original artists include Joan Manuel Serrat, Alejandro Sanz, Mexican rockers Maná, Dominican artist Juan Luis Guerra, Antonio Machín, Manolo García of El Último de la Fila, Luz Casal, Armando Manzanero, Los Jeros or Marifé de Triana. This project had a second part ten years later, Ámame como soy (nuevas joyas).

She has received many awards. Some of the most important ones include four Latin Grammys (three as the best flamenco music album and one as the best folk album), as well as Gold and Platinum records in Spain and other countries such as Colombia and Argentina, as she has gone beyond Spanish borders and has toured Latin America and Europe with great success. She is the only flamenco artist nominated for the Grammy for Best Latin Pop Album and has won two Premios Dial awards and a few other Premios Amigo awards.

In 2014, Soledad released Raíz, a collaborative album featuring Mexican singer Lila Downs and Niña Pastori, and received a nomination for a Grammy Award for Best Latin Pop Album and the Latin Grammy Award for Album of the Year, winning the Latin Grammy for Best Folk Album. The trio also collaborated with Santana on the track Una Noche en Nápoles for the 2014 album Corazón.

In 2018 she was awarded the Medalla de Andalucía, a prestigious Andalusian award. At that event she also sang the Andalusian hymn. In addition, she was given the Honorary Award for her National and International Career at the Premios Flamenco En La Piel awards at the International Salon of Flamenco Fashion (SIMOF) 2018.

She sang a version of Schubert's Ave Maria during Pope John Paul II's last visit to Madrid in May 2003 for 3 million people. Later this version was included in a new edition of her album María released in 2006.

One of her hits, "Cai", was a song composed by Alejandro Sanz that is dedicated to the city of Cádiz.

She participated as a special guest in the event in which Alejandro Sanz celebrated the 20th anniversary of his album "Más".

She is married to Julio Jiménez Borja "Chaboli", co-producer, composer and percussionist on her albums. She is the great-granddaughter of flamenco singer Inés "la del Pelao".

On May 7, 2018, Niña Pastori talked to the `20 Minutes` magazine about her new work "Bajo tus alas" and her current career. With testimonies as beautiful as: "at 40 years old I have more power than ever" or "we are not the weak ones, women have an innate ability to survive". Pastori talks about silence saying that "It is essential to have some silence. We need to listen a little bit more, stop and listen to the silence. For me it is vital, fundamental, to listen to silence. " In this interview, she assures that it is indifferent to her to talk about her private life and her family, since she has nothing to hide. She feels very loved by her fans, who assure that she is a very natural artist "I love when they tell me that they love me because I am very natural. I love when I'm stopped by women on the street and they say: "You seem so normal, you are just like us". I have a life like everyone else, through good times and bad times I have suffered." In addition, she assures that being happy all the time is not good, if she has bad moments, she does not hide it to her fans, at times she'd a tear on stage.  With this interview, Pastori showed her most personal and human side, ensuring that what makes her the happiest is singing, especially singing about what she loves.

Discography

-Entre dos puertos. 1996

Directed by Paco Ortega and Alejandro Sanz, it was her first studio album that she recorded aged just 17. The album became platinum, (150,000 copies were sold), and her single "Tú me camelas" managed to be among the top of the music charts for months. As for its content, the album offers a mix of pop along with rumbas, fandangos, bulerías and tanguillos.

-Eres Luz. 1998

Eres luz is the second studio album by Niña Pastori, produced by Paco Ortega and Alejandro Sanz, published by Sony BMG, and recorded and released in 1998. The album includes songs with Alejandro Sanz, Parrita, Paco Ortega and her brother, Paco. This album offers a fresh touch of flamenco.

-Canaílla. 2000

It is her record of consecration and was produced by Alejandro Sanz. It offers collaborations with various artists such as José Miguel and Antonio Carmona, Vicente Amigo, Moraito, etc. It is a disc of varied content, catering to all audiences.

-María. 2002

This album was again designed and planned by Niña Pastori and her partner Julio Jiménez Borja, alias Chaboli. Thus, the latter was the one that produced all the songs on the album except two, "Amor de San Juan" and "De boca en boca", which were produced by his author, José Manuel Ruiz, known as Queco.

-No hay quinto malo. 2004

“No hay quinto malo” is the fifth album of Niña Pastori. It offers both CD and DVD versions, and was shot by director Juan Estelrich. Niña Pastori participated in the composition of all the songs of this album along with her husband, Chaboli, and Jeros. It is her most risky album, but also the most pure and intimate.

-Joyas prestadas. 2006

In this album, the artist covers her favorite songs for the first time, which are special for her and have helped her in her life. It includes songs by Joan Manuel Serrat, Alejandro Sanz, Maná, Juan Luis Guerra, Antonio Machín, Manolo García, Luz Casal, Armando Manzanero and Marifé de Triana.

-Esperando verte. 2009

She recorded it together with her husband, Chaboli, whilst being pregnant with her first daughter, to which she refers in many of her songs. The album includes very varied styles from tangos to bulerías and fandangos.

The title track of the album, "Esperando a verte", is a song dedicated entirely to her daughter. Thus, this album is considered for her as one of the most special due to her pregnancy.

-La orilla de mi pelo. 2011

This album won the Latin Grammy for the Best Flamenco Album. In this album pop predominates over flamenco. Thus, there is a change in the accompaniment of her songs, leaving aside the flamenco guitar and replacing it with the acoustic and electric guitar.

As Niña Pastori said, "in this new album the songs are made of passion, romance, temptation, blood, sigh, purity, magic, flavor and joy".

- Raíz. 2014.

In this album she works with the Mexican Lila Downs and the Argentinian Soledad Pastorutti. It is produced by Aneiro Taño and J. Jiménez, also known as "Chaboli". The three women work together to showcase the best of their three nations. Through their songs they share with us the most particular features of their folklore and their nations.

- Ámame como soy. 2015

This repertory arose from the collaborations of Niña Pastori with Ruben Blades, Juan Luis Guerra, Pancho Céspedes and Sara Baras for the first time.

-Bajo tus alas. 2018

This album was produced by Chaboli and mixed in Los Angeles by Rafa Sardina. In `Bajo tus alas`, Niña Pastori offers songs accompanied by great musical artists such as Manuel Carrasco, Guaco, Vanesa Martín and Pablo Alborán.

Undoubtedly, yet another step in her personal style, highlighting the depth of her voice  and, above all, the flamenco that she carries in her blood.

In addition, the artist has scheduled a new tour with this album that begins on May 4 in Malaga and which will be performed throughout Spain.

The starting point of her presentation tour of Bajo tus Alas will be the town of Campanario in Palencia.

The date of release of Niña Pastori's new songs will be on Monday, April 30. This event will take place in the Municipal Caseta of Campanario, starting at 11pm, with all the songs of Bajo tus Alas, which was edited only three days before this performance, on Friday, April 27.

Collaborations
La Roja Baila: Sergio Ramos, RedOne.
Entre dos puertos: Antonio Reyes (bailaor); Ricardo Miño, Moraíto Chico, Juan Manuel Cañizares, Rafael Riqueni and Ramón Trujillo (guitarista).
Eres luz: Moraíto, Juan Carlos Romero, Machuka, Alejandro Sanz, José Antonio Rodríguez and Juan Manuel Cañizares (guitarists); Manuel Soler, El Bandolero and Chaboli (percussionista).
Cañaílla: Guadiana (cantaor), Antonio Carmona (cantador); José Miguel Carmona, Diego Carrasco, Diego del Morao, Moraíto Chico and Vicente Amigo (guitarista); Alejandro Sanz (compositante); El Bandolero and Chaboli (percussionista).
María: Farruquito (bailaor); José Carlos Gómez, Moraíto Chico, Diego del Morao and José Antonio Rodríguez (guitarists); El Bandolero, Chaboli and Tino di Geraldo (percussionists).
No hay quinto malo: Paquete, Diego del Morao, Juan Carmona and José Miguel Carmona (guitarists); Luis Dulzaides, Tino di Geraldo and Chaboli (percussionists); Carles Benavent (bass); Victor Merlo (double bass).
Joyas prestadas: José Miguel Carmona and Diego Moreno (guitarists); Chaboli and Angie Bao (percussionist); Antonio Serrano (harmonica); Nacho Mañó and Antonio Ramos "Maca" (bass); José María Cortina and Santi Navalón (keyboards).
Raíz: Lila Downs and Soledad Pastorutti.

References

External links
MySpace profile
esflamenco.es (in English)
Interview with Niña Pastori

1978 births
Living people
Singers from Andalusia
Flamenco singers
Latin Grammy Award winners
People from San Fernando, Cádiz
Spanish Romani people
21st-century Spanish singers
21st-century Spanish women singers
Sony Music Spain artists
Women in Latin music